William Mäkinen (born June 19, 1995) is a Finnish professional ice hockey player. He is currently playing for KeuPa HT of the Finnish Mestis.

Mäkinen made his Liiga debut playing with SaiPa during the 2014-15 Liiga season.

References

External links

1995 births
Living people
Finnish ice hockey defencemen
Hokki players
KeuPa HT players
SaiPa players
SaPKo players
TuTo players
VHK Vsetín players
Lillehammer IK players
Grüner Ishockey players
Hockey Club de Cergy-Pontoise players
Finnish expatriate ice hockey players in the Czech Republic
Finnish expatriate ice hockey players in Norway
Finnish expatriate ice hockey players in France